Puddle of Mudd is an American rock band formed in Kansas City, Missouri in 1992. To date, the band has sold over seven million albums and has had a string of No. 1 mainstream rock singles in the United States. Their major-label debut Come Clean has sold over five million copies. They have released an extended play, an independent album and five studio albums, with their latest being Welcome to Galvania in September 2019.. Vocalist and guitarist Wes Scantlin remains the only consistent member throughout the band's history.

Puddle of Mudd has been described as post-grunge, nu metal, hard rock, and alternative metal.

History

Early years (1992–1999)
Puddle of Mudd was formed in 1992 in Kansas City by Wes Scantlin (lead vocals/rhythm guitar), Jimmy Allen (lead guitar), Sean Sammon (bass), and Kenny Burkitt (drums). According to Scantlin, the band name was inspired by practicing next to the Missouri river levee, which always inundated the band's practice space, but never ruined their equipment since they were on the second floor. In order to get to their practice space, the band "had to walk through a pile of shit."

In August 1994, the band played at the Missouri State Fair. The group's first release, Stuck, a seven-song EP, was released in 1994 on V&R Records. It was produced by the band and E.J. Rose, and was recorded at Red House Studio in Lawrence, Kansas. It spawned two radio singles (the first was "You Don't Know", the second "Drift and Die").

Minus Jimmy Allen, the group released their eleven-song debut album, Abrasive, in 1997 on Madison, Wisconsin-based record label Hardknocks Records. Three of the songs from Abrasive were later re-recorded for the band's major-label debut Come Clean. Differences of opinion and other factors led to the break-up of the original Puddle of Mudd by early 1999, leaving Scantlin as the only original member.

Come Clean (2000–2002)
Scantlin's big break in the music business came after a copy of his demo tape was delivered to Fred Durst. Durst contacted Scantlin, and after hearing that his band had broken up, decided to bring him to California to attempt to put a new band together. At a 2001 Flawless Records showcase, Durst noted that he originally disliked the band's material and told Scantlin to fire everyone else in the band and rebuild it from scratch.

One of the first people Scantlin met upon arriving in California was Doug Ardito, an intern at Interscope Records. When Scantlin found out about Ardito's bass playing, they decided to work together. They were still in need of a guitarist and drummer. Fred Durst decided to contact a guitarist he knew from his hometown of Jacksonville, Florida, Paul Phillips, who had formerly played in a local band there called Happy Hour. After getting the call from Durst, Paul decided to try out for Puddle of Mudd and was accepted, choosing to leave college in order to join. The band held auditions for a new drummer and selected Greg Upchurch, who was an ex-member of Eleven and had also toured with Chris Cornell.

Puddle of Mudd entered the studio in 2000 and released its major-label debut album Come Clean on August 28, 2001. The lead single from the album, "Control" was successful. It was also the theme song for WWE's Survivor Series 2001, which was critically acclaimed. The second single off the album, "Blurry", co-written with Jimmy Allen and Doug Ardito, turned out to be Puddle of Mudd's most successful single, reaching No. 5 on the Billboard Hot 100 and No. 8 in the UK Singles Chart, and also winning an ASCAP song of the year award for Ardito, Allen and Scantlin. The song was also used in the game Ace Combat 5, published by Namco. "Drift & Die" co-written by Jimmy Allen was also released as a single spending six weeks at the No. 1 on the Mainstream Rock Chart. The fourth single, "She Hates Me" co-written by Jimmy Allen was released in late 2002, and reached the No. 1 spot on the Mainstream Rock Tracks chart, as well as No. 13 on the Billboard Hot 100. Allen and Scantlin won the ASCAP award for most played rock song of the year.

The group then embarked on a European and American tour as the opening act for Godsmack and Deftones, and were also a part of the Family Values 2001 tour, alongside Linkin Park, Stone Temple Pilots, and Staind.

The album was certified triple platinum in the U.S. by the Recording Industry Association of America (RIAA) on January 31, 2003, and as of late 2006, total sales worldwide were in excess of five million copies.

Life on Display (2003–2005)
Puddle of Mudd's follow up, Life on Display, spawned three singles "Away From Me", "Heel Over Head", and "Spin You Around". The album sold below expectations. Although shortly after its release, the record was certified gold and to date, has sold over 706,000 copies. Some suggested this was the primary cause of drummer Greg Upchurch's leaving the band to join 3 Doors Down. Marisa Miller appeared in the music video for "Spin You Around". "Away From Me" was featured in The O.C. in 2004. The song "Nothing Left to Lose" was the official theme song of WWE's 2004 Royal Rumble.

Famous (2006–2008)

On October 9, 2007, the band released their third major label record, Famous. The first single, "Famous", was leaked through the band's Myspace page and radio in July before the CD was released.  It was a #1 single. Another track, "Merry Go Round", was released through iTunes before the official release. The following single, "Psycho", topped both the Mainstream Rock Tracks and Hot Modern Rock Tracks charts for nine weeks. "Livin' on Borrowed Time" and "We Don't Have To Look Back Now" were the final singles released.

In the spring of 2007, the band went on tour supporting Hinder and Papa Roach on the Door to Dorm tour.

Their song "Famous" was the WWE One Night Stand 2007 official theme song and was also featured in the video game WWE Smackdown vs Raw 2008, as well as UFC 2009 Undisputed.

Vol.4 Songs in the Key of Love and Hate (2009–2010)
In 2009, former guitarist Paul Phillips rejoined the band after replacement Christian Stone was let go on good terms. Around this time the band recruited Famous producer Brian Howes to begin recording a new record in Vancouver. Prior to the new album's release, band members said the album's name would be called 'Jacket on the Rack'. However, it was changed to Volume 4: Songs in the Key of Love & Hate. Released on December 8, it has gone on to sell around 100,000 copies. The first single, "Spaceship", was released in October 2009.

On February 10, 2010, a new song, "Shook Up the World", was released. The song was written for Team USA for use in the 2010 Winter Olympics. All proceeds from the song went to Team USA. Although intended for release during the Olympics, the deadline was missed. Later in the year bassist Doug Ardito left the band and was replaced by Jacksonville Burn Season frontman, Damien Starkey. They played at the Download Festival, and released their first best of collection, titled Icon, featuring the singles from their first four albums.

Re:(disc)overed (2011–2019)
The band released a cover album titled re:(disc)overed on August 30, 2011. The release featured covers of songs originally by The Rolling Stones, Bad Company, Led Zeppelin, AC/DC and others. According to original bassist Sean Sammon, it was confirmed that the band's first two albums, Stuck and Abrasive, would be re-released sometime in late 2011. Ardito rejoined the band in 2011 and proceeded to tour with them. Ryan Yerdon was also replaced by Shannon Boone. The band posted several online updates during 2012 suggesting that they were writing and recording a new album. Wes Scantlin was interviewed about his latest arrest for vandalism in July 2013, where he was quoted as saying "We have tons and tons of new hit songs. I write every single night, and we record all the time. We're getting ready to go in and do the record, tour a little bit for the summer, and then do the full production and get back on the scene."

Puddle of Mudd toured during 2014 featuring Wes Scantlin with an entirely different line-up. A non-album single, "Piece of the Action", was released in September 2014.

The band started recording a new album with Cameron Webb at Grandmaster Studios in 2015. The following year they took part in the Make America Rock Again super tour with other artists who had success throughout the 2000s including Trapt, Saving Abel, Alien Ant Farm, Crazy Town, 12 Stones, Tantric, Drowning Pool, P.O.D. and Fuel.

Welcome to Galvania (2019–present)
In July 2019, a new single, "Uh Oh", was released, with the full album Welcome to Galvania following in September.

In November 2019, the band performed an acoustic session for SiriusXM's Octane channel. The session went largely unnoticed until April 2020, when the Instagram music meme account @catatonicyouths posted edited clips of the band's cover of Nirvana's "About a Girl". The cover was also given a reaction video by YouTubers Jared Dines and Steve Terreberry. The cover has been widely criticised and ridiculed, with most of the focus being placed upon Scantlin's strained, uncomfortable, and off-key vocals. The original video, which has now received over one million views and has since gone unlisted, currently sits at 24,000 dislikes against 9,800 likes.

In 2022, Scantlin stated a new album was in the works, and was 'basically pretty much done'. No release date has been announced, but Scantlin later noted he plans on releasing it by the end of 2022.

Lip syncing and other controversies
Since 2012, Scantlin has been accused on numerous occasions of lip syncing during live performances.

On April 16, 2014, Scantlin had an on-stage meltdown during a show at Trees Dallas, in which he threw a microphone and beer into the audience, as well as appearing to threaten and attempt to physically attack members of the audience. He also received criticism as he appeared to be lip-syncing during the performance.

On June 20, 2015, the band was booed off stage at a show in Versailles, Ohio, after Scantlin was spotted lip-syncing to the songs. In response to the social media backlash, the band subsequently deleted their Facebook page. With the Facebook page available, the Austin, Texas-based rock band Black Heart Saints gained access as an opportunity to promote their music using the page title "Check This Band Out Instead", although later Puddle of Mudd decided to use the page again.

On August 18, 2017, Thetford Mines' Festival de la Relève had to cancel a performance by the band, who were the festival's headliners, after neither Scantlin nor the rest of the band appeared at Québec City Jean Lesage International Airport, where volunteers were to pick them up to drive them to the festival. No reason was given for the band's absence.

Connection with Fred Durst
Due to the notoriety surrounding how the band was signed with Durst, the band is often asked regarding their relationship with him. Scantlin criticized Durst in an interview in 2004 with Canada's Chart magazine: "He doesn't write our songs, he doesn't produce our songs, he doesn't do anything for us. He doesn't do our videos anymore. He doesn't do anything for this band. I don't know what he's doing, I don't know what the guy's like. All I know is that he's like Mr Hollywood guy, Mr Celebrity. Like, 'I don't hang out with anybody except Hollywood celebrities'. Every single fucking interview I've ever fucking done, I get asked about that fucking guy... And for me to do interviews all the time and be asked about this certain individual... People think he writes music with me or something. He does not do that. I just don't get it. We have nothing in common. He doesn't even call us, he has his assistant call us to congratulate us on our record. Yeah, that's how pathetic he is."

On April 22, 2008, in an interview with Artisan News Service, Wes Scantlin took back his previous criticism of Fred Durst: "[Fred] got our foot in the door and helped us out tremendously. I think nowadays he's doing a lot of directing and we don't really speak to him too much but we appreciate everything he's ever done for our careers."

Limp Bizkit and Puddle of Mudd played together on Epicenter 2011, along with another one of Durst's former proteges, Staind.

Scantlin later stated that he wanted to make a movie regarding his life and music career, and that he wanted to involve Durst, who had directed several films himself.

Band members

Current members
 Wes Scantlin – lead vocals (1992–present), rhythm guitar (1992–2011, 2012–present), lead guitar (1992, 1996–1999)
 Dave Moreno – drums, backing vocals (2005–2006, 2014–present)
 Matt Fuller – rhythm guitar (2012), lead guitar, backing vocals (2014–present)
 Michael John Adams – bass, backing vocals (2014–present)

Former members

Lead guitarists
 Jimmy Allen – (1992–1996, 2005–2006)
 Paul Phillips – backing vocals (1999–2005, 2009–2011) 
 Christian Stone – (2006–2009, 2011–2014)

Drummers
 Kenny Burkitt (1992–2000)
Josh Freese – session musician (2000–2001)
 Greg Upchurch (2001–2005, 2011)
 Ryan Yerdon (2006–2011)
 Shannon Boone (2011–2014)

Bassists
 Sean Sammon - (1992–2002)
 Doug Ardito – backing vocals (1999–2010, 2011–2014)
 Damien Starkey – backing vocals (2010–2013)

Rhythm guitarist
 Adam Latiff – backing vocals (2011–2012)

Timeline

Discography

Studio albums
 Come Clean (2001)
 Life on Display (2003)
 Famous (2007)
 Volume 4: Songs in the Key of Love & Hate (2009)
 Welcome to Galvania (2019)

Accolades

Awards and nominations

Notes

References

External links
 

 
American alternative metal musical groups
American hard rock musical groups
American nu metal musical groups
American post-grunge musical groups
Kerrang! Awards winners
Musical groups established in 1992
Musical groups from Kansas City, Missouri
Musical quartets
Rock music groups from Missouri
Alternative rock groups from Missouri